This is a list of electoral district results for the 1957 Queensland state election.

Results by electoral district

Aubigny

Balonne

Barambah

Barcoo

Baroona

Belyando

Bremer

Brisbane

Bulimba

Bundaberg

Buranda

Burdekin

Cairns

Callide

Carnarvon

Carpentaria

Charters Towers

Chermside

Clayfield

Condamine

Cook

Cooroora

Coorparoo

Cunningham

Darlington

Fassifern

Fitzroy

Flinders

By-election 

 This result was overturned by the Court of Disputed Returns and a by-election was held on 17 May 1958.

Fortitude Valley

Gregory 

The election in Gregory was delayed due to the death of incumbent MP George Devries weeks before the election. A supplementary election was held in October, two months after the rest of the state.

Haughton

Hinchinbrook

Ipswich

Isis

Ithaca

Kedron

Kelvin Grove

Keppel

Kurilpa

Landsborough

Lockyer

Mackay

Mackenzie

Marodian

Maryborough

Merthyr

Mirani

Mount Coot-tha

Mount Gravatt

Mourilyan

Mulgrave

By-election 

 This by-election was caused by the death of Bob Watson. It was held on 6 June 1959.

Mundingburra

Murrumba

Nash

Norman

North Toowoomba

By-election 

 This by-election was caused by the death of Les Wood. It was held on 31 May 1958.

Nundah

Port Curtis

Rockhampton

Roma

Sandgate

Sherwood

Somerset

South Brisbane

Southport

Tablelands

Toowong

Toowoomba

Townsville

Warrego

Warwick

Whitsunday

Windsor

Wynnum

Yeronga

See also 

 1957 Queensland state election
 Candidates of the Queensland state election, 1957
 Members of the Queensland Legislative Assembly, 1957-1960

References 

Results of Queensland elections